RedFox (formerly SlySoft) is a software development company based in Belize. The company is most prominently known for its software AnyDVD, which can be used to bypass copy protection measures on optical media, including DVD and Blu-ray Disc media, as well as CloneCD, which is used to back up the contents of optical discs.

The company formerly operated as the St. John's, Antigua and Barbuda-based SlySoft. At some point in February 2016, SlySoft shut down, with its home page replaced by a message citing "recent regulatory requirements". On or around 16 February 2016, AACS LA had requested that the Office of the United States Trade Representative place Antigua and Barbuda on its Priority Watch List of countries that fail to prevent intellectual property violations, with specific reference to SlySoft. However, the company's online forum remained online, and had replaced the brand SlySoft with "RedFox". SlySoft developers also revealed that none of the company's staff were actually based in Antigua, that the company was not involved in legal settlements from AACS LA, and that key staff members still had access to SlySoft's technical infrastructure—including build systems and licensing servers—feasibly allowing development of AnyDVD to continue.

On 2 March 2016, SlySoft reformed as RedFox, under a top-level domain based in Belize, and released a new version of AnyDVD.

Products
 AnyDVD to remove/disable DRM restrictions and user prohibited operations on DVD films, and to fix structure protections and mastering errors
 AnyDVD HD – to remove DRM, lock-outs, and UOPs on DVD films and additionally High Definition media, specifically Blu-ray Disc and HD DVD
 AnyStream – to download and remove DRM from streaming video on Amazon Prime Video, Disney+, HBO Max, Hulu (USA) and Netflix 
 CloneCD – to copy optical discs in raw format
 CloneDVD mobile – to convert DVD files to mobile video players like the iPod or the PlayStation Portable
 Game Jackal – to create CD profiles so a disc isn't required when starting the game
 Game Jackal Enterprise – extended version of Game Jackal with additional features such as automatic distribution of game profiles to client machines

Some products are now supported by Elaborate Bytes such as Clone DVD and Virtual CloneDrive.

AACS and BD+
SlySoft was the first to offer AACS circumvention that worked for any disc available; previous programs only cracked "compatible" discs using a database of known keys.

On 8 November 2007, SlySoft claimed to have completely cracked BD+.  However, this turned out to be incorrect, as subsequent versions of BD+ security code have caused SlySoft to re-design its software.  On 3 March 2008, SlySoft updated AnyDVD HD allowing the full decryption of BD+, allowing for not only the viewing of the film itself but also playing and copying disks with third-party software.  A third iteration of BD+ was released in November 2008, and was announced to be cracked by SlySoft with the release of AnyDVD HD 6.5.0.2 on 29 December 2008. A fourth version of BD+ security code was discovered with the movie Australia on 17 February 2009, thwarting the effectiveness of SlySoft's software.

However, on 19 March 2009, SlySoft updated AnyDVD HD to version 6.5.3.1 which allowed the decryption of the new version of BD+ used by Australia.

Licensing 

On 1 December 2008 SlySoft announced it would for the first time begin charging its customers for updates to its software.

In November 2010, SlySoft initially announced the discontinuation of the lifetime licensing option beginning January 2011. An e-mail announcing the change ahead of time was sent to all registered customers allowing everyone the chance to purchase the lifetime option "while it is still possible;" and the notice was posted to their official forums. In January 2011, all announcements regarding the change were deleted without comment and a new structured licensing plan was put into place; including the lifetime licensing option at the highest priced tier. SlySoft was able to balance the internal cost matter and the licensing strategy in such a way as to allow continuation of the "lifetime" license option.  The 'update service' will only allow updates with a valid license and users are warned if they attempt to install an update beyond the license expiry date. If the user cancels the update the current paid-up license will continue to work. If the user continues then a "renewal" is required.

Following the collapse of Slysoft, holders of a SlySoft AnyDVD/AnyDVD HD Lifetime License are required to purchase a new license for use with the RedFox software beginning with Version 8.0.2.0. Version 7.6.9.5 will be able to use the prior license interminably; however, it will not have access to updates for the latest decryption of copy-protection.

See also
AnyDVD
CloneCD
CloneDVD
DVD ripper software with similar features
DVD Shrink
HandBrake
K9Copy

References

Further reading
"Appapalooza", Computer Power User (CPU), October 2009 • Vol.9 Issue 10, Pages 60–70
"What's Happening", Computer Power User (CPU), January 2008 • Vol.8 Issue 1, Pages 6–11
"What's Happening", Computer Power User (CPU), March 2009 • Vol.9 Issue 3, Pages 9–16
"The Bleeding Edge of Software", Computer Power User (CPU), February 2009 • Vol.9 Issue, 2 Page 72

External links
 
 
 
 
 
 Elaborate Bytes

Software companies of Belize
Cryptography companies
Disk image emulators
Notorious markets
Belizean brands